Gonaxis is a genus of air-breathing land snails, terrestrial pulmonate [[gastr
opod]] mollusks in the family Streptaxidae.

Distribution 
Distribution of the genus Gonaxis include Equatorial Africa and South Africa:
 South Africa
 Tanzania
 Uganda (2 species)
 ...

Species
Species within the genus Gonaxis include:
 Gonaxis abessinicus (Thiele, 1933)
 Gonaxis aethiopicus (Thiele, 1933)
 Gonaxis albidus (L. Pfeiffer, 1845)
 Gonaxis benthencourti (Nobre, 1905)
 Gonaxis blacklocki Connolly, 1928
 Gonaxis bottegoi (E. von Martens, 1895)
 Gonaxis breviculus (E. A. Smith, 1890)
 Gonaxis camerunensis (D'Ailly, 1896)
 Gonaxis costata Verdcourt, 1963 †
 Gonaxis cressyi Connolly, 1922
 Gonaxis cylindricus (K. L. Pfeiffer, 1952)
 Gonaxis denticulatus (Dohrn, 1878)
 Gonaxis elegans (Pickford, 2009) †
 Gonaxis elgonensis (Preston, 1913)
 Gonaxis gibbonsi Taylor, 1877
 Gonaxis gibbosus (Bourguignat, 1890)
 Gonaxis innocens (Preston, 1913)
 Gonaxis jeanneli (Germain, 1934)
 Gonaxis johnstoni (E. A. Smith, 1899)
 Gonaxis kivuensis (Preston, 1913)
 Gonaxis kizinga (Tattersfield, 1999)
 Gonaxis lata (E. A. Smith, 1880)
 Gonaxis latula (Martens, 1895)
 Gonaxis mamboiensis (E. A. Smith, 1890)
 Gonaxis margarita (Preston, 1913)
 Gonaxis masabana (Connolly, 1930)
 Gonaxis maugerae (J. E. Gray, 1837)
 Gonaxis micans (Putzeys, 1899)
 Gonaxis microstriatus (Preston, 1912)
 Gonaxis miocraveni Pickford, 2009 †
 Gonaxis montisnimbae Binder, 1960 
 Gonaxis monrovia (Rang, 1831)
 Gonaxis mozambicensis (E. A. Smith, 1880)
 Gonaxis mzinga (Tattersfield, 1999)
 Gonaxis pileolus Connolly, 1928
 Gonaxis prostratus (L. Pfeiffer, 1856)
 Gonaxis pseudotmesis Connolly, 1942
 Gonaxis pupilla (Morelet, 1888)
 Gonaxis recta (Bourguignat, 1890)
 Gonaxis schweitzeri (Dohrn, 1878)
 Gonaxis sudanicus (Preston, 1914)
 Gonaxis translucidus (Dupuis & Putzeys, 1901)
 Gonaxis turbinatus (Morelet, 1867)
 Gonaxis usambarensis Verdcourt
 Gonaxis vitreus (Morelet, 1867)
 Gonaxis vulcani (Thiele, 1911)
 Gonaxis welwitschi (Morelet, 1867)

Species brought into synonymy
 Gonaxis quadrilateralis Preston, 1910 / Gonaxis (Macrogonaxis) quadrilateralis (Preston, 1910) / Macrogonaxis quadrilateralis: synonym of Tayloria quadrilateralis (Preston, 1910) (superseded combination)
 Gonaxis vosseleri Thiele: synonym of Afristreptaxis vosseleri (Thiele, 1911) (superseded combination)

References

 Bourguignat, J.-R. (1890). Mollusques de l'Afrique équatoriale de Moguedouchou à Bagamoyo et de Bagamoyo au Tanganika. 1–229, pls 1–8. Book dated 1889, publication date 1890
 Bank, R. A. (2017). Classification of the Recent terrestrial Gastropoda of the World. Last update: July 16, 2017

External links
 

Streptaxidae